Nashoba Valley Ski Area is a small ski area in Westford, Massachusetts, United States, located at 79 Powers Road. It borders on Littleton, Massachusetts. Operating each winter since its opening in 1964, it has 17 trails, including a terrain park considered one of the best in Massachusetts. The area also features a tubing park with 16 runs served by two Poma handle tows and a Sun-Kid Conveyor; this is on the same property, but has a separate entrance on Route 119 in Littleton, Massachusetts.

Lifts

The area is served by 4 chairlifts, 4 conveyor lifts, and 3 rope tows.  Currently the top is only accessible by the chairlifts, but used to be served by a rope tow powered by an old school bus and a T-Bar.  All intermediate and advanced terrain is accessible from any chairlift.

The beginner area, which has the easiest trails, goes only about a quarter of the way up the hill. It is served by 3 rope tows and four Sun-Kid conveyor belt lifts. The longest trail is 1400 feet.

Chairlifts

Chief Triple is a Borvig triple chair.

Wardance Triple is a CTEC triple chair, this was built to replace the original rope tow to the top, although the two co-existed for a number of years. Note that the rope-tow was a much faster way to get to the top.

Snowdance Double is a Savio double chair.

Sundance Triple is a CTEC triple chair.

Surface Lifts

Papoose is a Sun-Kid conveyor belt lift which replaces a Gasoline powered rope tow of the same name, which ran about 6 feet to the east of the present lift.

Totem is a Sun-Kid conveyor belt lift located adjacent to Papoose.

Pow Wow is a rope tow, built out of an old dump truck, the rope runs between the double tires, and over old car wheel rims mounted on old telephone poles.  The lift was originally powered by the truck's diesel engine, but was later converted to run on an electric motor. This lift has two ropes that run parallel over both truck wheels, and is considered as two separate lifts, however both ropes are powered by the same motor, so they start and stop at the same times.

Peace Pipe is a rope tow built in a similar fashion to the Pow Wow tow, except that it has only one rope.

Lil'Hawk is a Sun-Kid conveyor belt lift, which was originally built at the base of the lift line for the "Tomahawk T-Bar", but was later moved to a location between the bottom terminals of the Snowdance Double and the Sundance Triple.

Tahu is a Sun-Kid conveyor belt lift, this conveyor was brand new for the 2014-2015 season, operating between the beginner area and Nashoba Slope.

Trails 
Black Diamonds:
Lobo,
Warrior,
Chief,
Bull Run,
Wardance

Blue Squares:
Tomahawk,
Big Bow,
Dog Leg,
Nashoba Slope,
Nashoba Glades,
Sundance (Usually freestyle terrain),
Indian Run, 
Nashoba Trail

Green Circles:(accessible only by tow rope or magic carpet)
Papoose,
Pow-Wow,
Peacepipe,
Tahu

Tubing Park
The tubing park is located at a separate entrance at 179 Great Rd, Littleton, MA 01460. The tubing park has 18 lanes serviced by a conveyor and 2 rope tows. The tubing park also has its own lodge and restaurant.

Restaurants 
The Outlook Restaurant and Lounge
The Sunset Tiki Bar and Grill

See also 
List of ski areas and resorts in the United States

References

External links
 Nashoba Valley Ski Area - Official site
 www.skiresorts-test.com - Nashoba Valley Ski Area on skiresorts-test.com
 http://dineoutlook.com/ - The Outlook Restaurant
 http://sunset-tiki.com/ - The Sunset Tiki Bar and Grill

Buildings and structures in Westford, Massachusetts
Ski areas and resorts in Massachusetts
Sports venues in Middlesex County, Massachusetts